Carlos Herrera (born 12 September 1997) is a Mexican professional footballer who plays as a goalkeeper for Monterey Bay in the USL Championship.

Career

College career 

Herrera started his college career at Iowa Western Community College, transferring after two years to Texas A&M International University.

While in college Herrera played for NPSL clubs Little Rock Rangers and Laredo Heat.

Monterey Bay 

Seeking his first professional contract, Herrera trialed with Monterey Bay before the start of their inaugural season, but ultimately wasn't signed. However, after Union goalkeeper Rafael Díaz suffered an injury, Monterey Bay signed Herrera to a 25-day contract on 14 April 2022. His contract was extended through the remainder of the season on 6 May 2022. The very next day Herrera would make his first professional appearance, starting in the club's first-ever home match on 7 May 2022. Herrera would lead the team to a 1–0 win over Las Vegas Lights, Monterey Bay's first shutout in club history.

References 

1997 births
Living people
Association football goalkeepers
Texas A&M International Dustdevils men's soccer players
Laredo Heat players
Monterey Bay FC players
USL Championship players
Footballers from Mexico City
Mexican footballers
Mexican expatriate footballers
Expatriate soccer players in the United States